Bedlam (Jesse Aaronson) is a mutant superhero appearing in American comic books published by Marvel Comics. He originally possessed the mutant ability to create and project a bio-EM field. This has the effect of temporarily disabling any similarly powered technology in the vicinity. He can also utilize his power to scan the environment for other pre-existing energy fields. After the High Evolutionary reset the mutant genome in every mutant on the planet, Jesse's abilities expanded to be able to affect the human brain's neural chemistry, thus allowing him to project the illusion of pain and confusion into other people.

The character made his live-action cinematic debut in the film Deadpool 2, portrayed by Terry Crews.

Fictional character biography
Jesse Aaronson was orphaned at the age of 5 after his parents were killed in a car crash. After that, he and his brother Christopher were put into foster care separately. Jesse went through multiple foster homes due to his emotional instability and was forced to go through many therapists before being placed in a psychiatric hospital at 13. He was exploited during that time by one of the doctors, who wanted to use Jesse's burgeoning powers for a book and performed experiments on him, and tried to convince Jesse that his brother was simply a figment of his imagination. Jesse was eventually rescued by Lucas Whyndam and ended up in the hands of the Professor Charles Xavier's Mutant Underground Support Engine (M.U.S.E.), a group based out of Montana with the goal of rescuing mutants and training them as field agents. 

When he reached the age of 19, Jesse decided to leave M.U.S.E. in order to track down his brother once and for all. He enlisted the help of the mutant spy and former X-Force member, Domino. He offered her information regarding the whereabouts of the Prime Sentinel unit named Ekaterina Gryaznova in exchange for Domino's help. Gryaznova, now calling herself Gryphon, had implanted a device in Domino's body several months ago, which severely diminished her mutant powers. Upon entering the base, Domino was captured but Bedlam managed to escape. Using his resources from M.U.S.E., he managed to track down X-Force in San Francisco and break into their headquarters, in order to ask them for help. The team managed to free Domino and apparently kill Gryphon. In the process, Bedlam used his power to short circuit Domino's implant.

Keeping up her end of the bargain, Domino managed to find information regarding his family. His parents were actually information analysts at the National Security Department. They paid a visit to his parents' former supervisor, Dabney Saunders, who was residing in a retirement home, babbling incoherent sentences. Domino, however, discovered the orderly in charge of Saunders informing an unidentified man about their visit. Both Bedlam and Domino broke into the mysterious man's home using Jesse's power and were subsequently attacked by Magma and Paradigm. Bedlam used his powers to disrupt Paradigm's electronics, knocking out Magma in the process. However, they were subdued by none other than Jesse's brother, Christopher. Christopher, calling himself King Bedlam, has the power to disrupt the higher functions of the brain. Chris was tagged as a mutant at the age of six by the N.S.D. and was taken into a research center after their parents' death. At age 13 he fled, destroying Saunders mind in the process. He had now founded a new team of Hellions and offered an invitation of membership to Jesse, who gladly accepted. The group's true intentions, however, were to reanimate the Armageddon Man in order to blackmail the U.S. government into paying one billion dollars. X-Force managed to subdue the Armageddon Man, but the New Hellions managed to escape. Jesse was invited back to join X-Force, as he had discovered that it was his brother responsible for their parents' death.

After several missions with the team, Jesse learned martial arts through a "Delphi box" given to him by Peter Wisdom. The team also learned of Bedlam's unique condition, which forced him to take medication in order to keep his own power from scrambling his brain. After the High Evolutionary removed every mutants' power and subsequently restored it, the team took on a new direction. Peter Wisdom was now X-Force's leader, while Domino and Moonstar had quit. Wisdom taught them how to use their new abilities. In Jesse's case, he could generate an electromagnetic pulse, disrupt machinery within a certain distance without having to be in physical contact with the target, and could also disrupt neural responses from a distance just like his brother. He remained with the team until their apparent deaths, where he used his power to destroy an underground alien colony.

After a new group of "pop star" mutants began calling themselves X-Force, the original team crashed their press conference. The only missing member was Jesse. Months later when a group called the Church of Humanity crucified some mutants on the lawn on the mansion, Jesse was found among them. Archangel used his healing blood to revive Magma and Jubilee, but along with several other mutants, Jesse apparently did not have the same luck.

After Xavier and Magneto, with the secret help of Moira MacTaggert, put their plan in motion to start the mutant nation of Krakoa, Jesse now finds himself living on the utopian-like island with his fellow mutants.

Powers and abilities
Through a "Delphi box" Jesse had the memories of a karate black belt, and thus could perform with those skills. He continued to further his hand-to-hand training with both Domino and Pete Wisdom.

His mutant ability allowed him to sense and perceive energy signatures and generate a bio-EM field that wreaked havoc with electrical and certain mechanical systems, and could affect the neural chemical responses of a living brain to induce states such as pain, sleep, or confusion. At first strictly touch based aside from sensing energy fields and tracking others by their biological EM signature, the restarting of every mutant's powers by the High Evolutionary later enabled him to generate electromagnetic pulses that cover whole city blocks and also disrupt neural responses from afar not unlike his brother could.

As part of his training with the Mutant Underground, Jesse was adept in covert ops and intelligence gathering such as computer hacking.

Reception
 In 2014, Entertainment Weekly ranked Bedlam 45th in their "Let's rank every X-Man ever" list.
 In 2018, CBR.com ranked Bedlam 20th in their "X-Force: 20 Powerful Members" list.

Other characters named Bedlam
There are other characters in Marvel Comics that have also called themselves Bedlam:

 One Bedlam is a mutate who is an Alpha Flight villain.

 One Bedlam is a future version of Eddie Brock's codex that was given life and became a Symbiote. During the events of Dark Web, Eddie is confronted by Goblin Queen and Chasm after he lands in Limbo. He asks for their help in reuniting with his son, Dylan Brock, but Chasm uses his powers to mess with Eddie's mind to make him more complicit, causing him and his symbiote to revert to the tradition Venom look and become unhinged. Following a fight with X-Men member Synch and being bombarded with visions of him being alone, Eddie's worst fears are realized as he turns into Bedlam.

Other versions
Although his technical debut, Jesse appears alongside his brother (here named Terrence and called the Bedlam Brothers) in the "Age of Apocalypse" storyline. In that reality, he worked for Sinister's Elite Mutant Force in his pens.  He eventually turned on Havok, in order to help Cyclops and Jean Grey to escape the pens and begin a path of redemption.

In other media
Bedlam appears in the live-action film Deadpool 2, portrayed by Terry Crews. He is recruited into X-Force by Deadpool and Weasel. However, crosswinds blow Bedlam's parachute off-course, causing him to crash into a bus. He is last seen receiving CPR, leaving his fate unknown.

References

External links
 Bedlam on the Marvel Universe Character Bio Wiki
 World of Black Heroes: Bedlam Biography
 UncannyXmen.net Character Profile on Bedlam

Black characters in films
Characters created by John Francis Moore (writer)
Comics characters introduced in 1995
Comics characters introduced in 1998
Deadpool characters
Marvel Comics superheroes
Fictional African-American people
Fictional characters with electric or magnetic abilities
Marvel Comics martial artists
Marvel Comics mutants

X-Men supporting characters